Henry Frank Jones (21 August 1920 – 4 March 1964) was a Canadian lawyer and politician. Jones served as a Progressive Conservative party member of the House of Commons of Canada. He was born in Lloydminster, Saskatchewan and became a barrister by career.

He was first elected at the Saskatoon riding in 
the 1957 general election, then re-elected there for successive terms in 1958, 1962 and 1963. Jones died in office on 4 March 1964, during his term in the 26th Canadian Parliament.

Jones served as Parliamentary Secretary to the Minister of Veterans Affairs from 1960 to 1963.

External links
 

1920 births
1964 deaths
Lawyers in Saskatchewan
Members of the House of Commons of Canada from Saskatchewan
People from Lloydminster
Progressive Conservative Party of Canada MPs
20th-century Canadian lawyers